The Boojum forest is an area in central Baja California, Mexico, near Catiavinia known for endemic flora so bizarre and grotesque in appearance that the area was named after mathematician/logician Lewis Carroll's imaginary landscape story, The Hunting of the Snark.

The area is characterized by almost no rainfall, as opposed to the two coasts of the Baja Peninsula, exotic plants such as Fouquieria columnaris, which can grow up to 50 feet tall with an 18-inch diameter. Large rounded granitic boulders appear and so do the columnar cacti such as Ferocactus gracilis, huge fleshy "red blooded" elephant trees, Bursera microphylla, huge endemic ocotillo (Fouquieria peninsularis) with flaming red flowered tipped ends, and the world's largest cactus, the columnar Cardon, Pachycereus pringlei.

Location

The forest is about 220 miles south of Tijuana along highway one in Baja California, Mexico.

External links
 Baja Highway: The Catavina Desert

Natural history of Baja California